= Readicide =

2008 nonfiction book

Readicide: How Schools Are Killing Reading and What You Can Do About It
- Author: Kelly Gallagher
- Genre: Non-fiction
- Publication date: 2009

Readicide: How Schools Are Killing Reading and What You Can Do About It is a 2009 non-fiction book by high school teacher and author Kelly Gallagher.

== Description ==
The book documents how teachers tend to stop students from enjoying reading by mainly focusing on tests. Gallagher believes that students should be both readers and critical thinkers of what they are reading. However, Gallagher criticizes both extremes of the approaches to teaching reading. The term readicide is defined as the "systematic killing of the love of reading, often exacerbated by the inane, mind-numbing practices found in our schools." A large portion of the book details how Gallagher teaches the activity of reading to his students.
